"Faster" is a song written by Dutch symphonic metal and rock band Within Temptation. It was released as the first single from their fifth studio album The Unforgiving on 21 January 2011. It had its worldwide radio première on 96.3 Rock Radio on the same day. The song was produced by their longtime producer Daniel Gibson, with Stefan Helleblad and Within Temptation serving as additional producers.

The song is part of the transmedia storytelling project the band undertook with The Unforgiving. It accompanied a music video released on 31 January 2011 and the short film Mother Maiden, released alongside the official music video. 

The single achieved commercial success in the band's homecountry, the Netherlands, and moderate commercial success across Europe. It peaked at number 11 in the Dutch Top 100., entered single charts in Belgium, Germany, Finland, and Portugal, and rock single charts in Czech Republic and in the United Kingdom It has been featured on the annual Dutch Top 2000 since 2015.

Background
Robert Westerholt said:

Sharon den Adel said in an interview with Metal Ways:

Den Adel's explanation of the song's lyrics in an interview with Songfacts:

Videos

Mother Maiden short film
The Unforgiving's first short film, Mother Maiden, was combined with the music video to "Faster" and released on 31 January 2011. The film begins with the character of Mother Maiden (played by Dawn Mastin) writing a letter and reciting a monologue which explains that she controls lost souls to seek revenge on "those with a dark heart."
While Mother Maiden continues to speak, the film cuts between her and the "lost souls" which she controls. Firstly, we see the character of Sinéad dragging an unconscious man on top of a train, who awakens just before being killed by a low hanging rail road signal. We then cut to "The Triplets" (more of Mother Maiden's workers) crawling into a window, after which an unseen woman screams and the Triplets reappear with their mouths smeared with blood. Finally, we are shown a man shaving before an arm bursts from his bathroom mirror and strangles him. At this point, the "Faster" music video begins with the band playing the song in full. As it ends, we see Sinéad's corpse awakening in a morgue. The script was written by Steven O'Connell and Tim Smit. The music video and short movie were directed by Joeri Molsheimer.

Personnel

Cast
Dawn Mastin as Mother Maiden
Nicola Hemink as Sinéad
Key Graham as Sinéad's Father
Christopher Van Dujin as Triplets
Matthijx Kat as Man on train
Banny Bakker as Shaving Man

Alternate music video
At the same time as the release of the full "Faster" music video and Mother Maiden short film, an edited version of the song was released on YouTube with the same footage inter-cut (rather than as originally presented in their separate components of the three short-films –Mother Maiden, Sinéad and Triplets).

Track

Charts

Weekly charts

Year-end charts

References

2011 singles
Within Temptation songs
Songs written by Sharon den Adel
Songs written by Robert Westerholt
Dutch hard rock songs